was a renowned Japanese photographer.

References

Japanese photographers
1923 births
1989 deaths